Xue Jiye (born in 1965 in Dalian, Liaoning) is a Chinese painter and sculptor. He graduated from Guangzhou Academy of Fine Arts in 1988 and currently lives and works in Beijing.

Xue Jiye and his work have been featured in various art exhibitions both in China and abroad, including the Guangdong Art Museum, National Gallery of Indonesia, Kunstverein Manneim, etc.

External links
 
 Xue Jiye at The Ministry of Art
 Xue Jiye featured at Kunstmagazin Berlin

Living people
Artists from Dalian
1965 births